Piryatinsky Uyezd (Пирятинский уезд) was one of the subdivisions of the Poltava Governorate of the Russian Empire. It was situated in the northwestern part of the governorate. Its administrative centre was Piryatin (Pyriatyn).

Demographics
At the time of the Russian Empire Census of 1897, Piryatinsky Uyezd had a population of 163,505. Of these, 95.2% spoke Ukrainian, 3.8% Yiddish and 0.9% Russian as their native language.

References

 
Uezds of Poltava Governorate
Poltava Governorate